Gorby no Pipeline Daisakusen is a puzzle video game developed by Compile for the MSX2, Famicom, and FM Towns. It was published by Tokuma Shoten in 1991.

In the game, the player assembles water pipe segments for a pipeline from Moscow to Tokyo in order to strengthen Japan–Soviet Union relations.

With permission of the Soviet embassy, the game and its promotional materials feature the name and likeness of Mikhail Gorbachev, who was President of the Soviet Union at the time of the game's development and release. The cover art of the game featuring Gorbachev was created by Takamasa Shimaura (島浦孝全).

Two months after Tokuma Shoten released Gorby no Pipeline Daisakusen in Japan, Sega published  for the Game Gear handheld game console. Both games were released in Japan several months before the dissolution of the Soviet Union.

The Famicom version was re-released on iOS through the PicoPico service and Windows through Project Egg in 2021, although references to Gorbachev have been removed or censored, including a game name change to Pipeline Daisakusen. The title screen was the only part of the game where Gorbachev was depicted and the game's graphic tiles that had his name and likeliness was overwritten with other tiles that were then used to enlarge the word "大作戦" (which is the "Daisakusen" in the name) and place it beside the "パイプライン" ("pipeline") that was there in the original.

Gameplay

In this falling-block puzzle game, a small girl—wearing a Russian national costume of sarafan, kokoshnik, and valenki—pushes tiles representing segments of water pipe down a two-dimensional, vertical shaft; this shaft is the field of play. A second girl, also in national costume, waves semaphore flags to give the impression that she guides the placement of the tiles.

The player must quickly rotate and place the tiles to catch and conduct a continuously-flowing stream of water from pipes on one side of the shaft to the other. When the player successfully links an inflow pipe on one side of the shaft to an outflow pipe on the other side, a row of tiles disappears, and the player earns points. If the player routes the water to a dead end, the game adds a layer of pipe segments for the player to clear. If the accumulating pipe segments stack to the top of the shaft, the game ends. By clearing the requisite number of rows, the player proceeds to the next game level.

Music
The background music for each level is a rendition of a Russian classical music composition. Among the selections are "The Great Gate of Kiev", the final movement from Mussorgsky's suite Pictures at an Exhibition (1874); "Swan's Theme" from Tchaikovsky's ballet Swan Lake (1876); and "Flight of the Bumblebee", an interlude from Rimsky-Korsakov's opera The Tale of Tsar Saltan (1900).

See also
Tetris (1984)
Pipe Mania (1989)

Notes

References

External links
 
 Instruction manual (Family Computer) at Giant Bomb

Satirical video games
Political satire video games
1991 video games
Cultural depictions of Mikhail Gorbachev
Video games based on real people
Falling block puzzle games
Video games set in the Soviet Union
Compile (company) games
Japan-exclusive video games
FM Towns games
MSX2 games
Nintendo Entertainment System games
Tokuma Shoten games
Japan–Soviet Union relations
Video games developed in Japan
Video games scored by Toshiaki Sakoda